Qinchuan may refer to:

 Qinchuan cattle, a breed of Turano-Mongolian cattle
 Qinchuan, a regional Qin school associated with Changshu
 Qinchuan, Lanzhou, a town of Lanzhou New Area
 BYD Auto, previously known as Qinchuan Automobile before BYD Company's acquisition

See also
 Qin Chuan (born 1975), Chinese pianist and professor